Walter "Richard" Hubbard (June 8, 1932 – May 3, 2011) was a political figure in Nova Scotia, Canada. He represented Yarmouth in the Nova Scotia House of Assembly from 1993 to 1998 as a Liberal member.

Before politics
Hubbard was born in Yarmouth, the son of Eli and Ann Celina (Thibeault) Hubbard. He served in the Royal Canadian Air Force for 24 years. After that he became the town's first recreation director. He was active in the Roman Catholic church and the Knights of Columbus where he was a Fourth Degree Knight.

References

1932 births
2011 deaths
Nova Scotia Liberal Party MLAs
Canadian educators
Acadian people